The Seventeenth Legislative Assembly of West Bengal constituted after the 2021 West Bengal Legislative Assembly elections which were concluded earlier on 29 April 2021 and the results were announced on 2 May 2021. The tenure of West Bengal Legislative Assembly is scheduled to end on 7 May 2026.

Notable Positions

Members of the 17th West Bengal Assembly 
Key:

  Bye-elected
  Switched party

Source

See also 

West Bengal Legislative Assembly
2021 West Bengal Legislative Assembly Elections
West Bengal
Mamata Banerjee

References 

West Bengal Legislative Assembly
2021 West Bengal Legislative Assembly election
West Bengal